Sabethes mosquitoes are primarily an arboreal genus, breeding in plant cavities. The type species is Sabethes locuples, first described by Jean-Baptiste Robineau-Desvoidy in 1827.

They are generally conspicuously ornamented with shining metallic scales. The antennae of the females of some Sabethes species have long, dense, flagellar whorls resembling those of the males of most other genera of mosquitoes.

Sabethes species mosquitoes occur in Central and South America.

Medical Importance

Sabethes chloropterus has been found infected with St. Louis encephalitis virus and Ilhéus virus, and transmits yellow fever virus to humans.

Subgenera and species

As listed by the Walter Reed Biosystematics Unit:

Subgenus Davismyia Lane and Cerqueira
Sabethes (Davismyia) petrocchiae (Shannon and Del Ponte) (syn.: Sabethes (Davismyia) monoleua Martini)
Subgenus Nomina Dubia 13
Sabethes lutzii Theobald nomen dubium
Subgenus Peytonulus Harbach
Sabethes (Peytonulus) aurescens (Lutz)
Sabethes (Peytonulus) fabricii Lane and Cerqueira
Sabethes (Peytonulus) gorgasi Duret
Sabethes (Peytonulus) hadrognathus Harbach
Sabethes (Peytonulus) identicus Dyar and Knab (syn.: Sabethes (Peytonulus) lutzianus Lane and Cerqueira)
Sabethes (Peytonulus) ignotus Harbach
Sabethes (Peytonulus) luxodens Hall, Howard and Harbach
Sabethes (Peytonulus) paradoxus Harbach
Sabethes (Peytonulus) soperi Lane and Cerqueira
Sabethes (Peytonulus) undosus (Coquillett)
Sabethes (Peytonulus) whitmani Lane and Cerqueira
Sabethes (Peytonulus) xenismus Harbach
Subgenus Sabethes Robineau-Desvoidy
Sabethes (Sabethes) albiprivus Theobald (syn.: Sabethes (Sabethes) albiprivatus Lutz, Sabethes (Sabethes) albiprivatus Theobald, and Sabethes (Sabethes) neivai Petrocchi)
Sabethes (Sabethes) amazonicus Gordon and Evans (syn.: Sabethes (Sabethes) happleri Bonne, and Sabethes (Sabethes) longfieldae Edwards)
Sabethes (Sabethes) batesi Lane and Cerqueira
Sabethes (Sabethes) belisarioi Neiva (syn.: Sabethes (Sabethes) argyronotum Edwards, Sabethes (Sabethes) goeldii Howard, Dyar, and Knab, and Sabethes (Sabethes) schausi Dyar and Knab)
Sabethes (Sabethes) bipartipes Dyar and Knab (syn.: Sabethes (Sabethes) chroiopus Dyar and Knab)
Sabethes (Sabethes) cyaneus (Fabricius) (syn.: Sabethes (Sabethes) locuples Robineau-Desvoidy, and Sabethes (Sabethes) remipes Wiedemann)
Sabethes (Sabethes) forattinii Cerqueira)
Sabethes (Sabethes) gymnothorax Harbach and Petersen
Sabethes (Sabethes) lanei Cerqueira
Sabethes (Sabethes) nitidus Theobald
Sabethes (Sabethes) ortizi Vargas and Díaz Nájera
Sabethes (Sabethes) paraitepuyensis Anduze
Sabethes (Sabethes) purpureus (Theobald) (syn.: Sabethes (Sabethes) purpureus Peryassu, and Sabethes (Sabethes) remipusculus Dyar)
Sabethes (Sabethes) quasicyaneus Peryassú
Sabethes (Sabethes) schnusei (Martini)
Sabethes (Sabethes) shannoni Cerqueira
Sabethes (Sabethes) spixi Cerqueira
Sabethes (Sabethes) tarsopus Dyar and Knab
Subgenus Sabethinus Lutz 
Sabethes (Sabethinus) idiogenes Harbach
Sabethes (Sabethinus) intermedius (Lutz)
Sabethes (Sabethinus) melanonymphe Dyar (syn.: Sabethes (Sabethinus) albiprivatus Theobald)
Sabethes (Sabethinus) xhyphydes Harbach
Subgenus Sabethoides Theobald
Sabethes (Sabethoides) chloropterus (von Humboldt) (syn.: Sabethes (Sabethoides) confusus Theobald, Sabethes (Sabethoides) imperfectus Bonne-Wepster and Bonne, and Sabethes (Sabethoides) rangeli Surcouf and Gonzales-Rincones)
Sabethes (Sabethoides) conditus Moses, Howard and Harbach
Sabethes (Sabethoides) glaucodaemon (Dyar and Shannon)
Sabethes (Sabethoides) tridentatus Cerqueira

References

Culicinae
Mosquito genera
Taxa named by Jean-Baptiste Robineau-Desvoidy